The British Fast5 Netball All-Stars Championship is a Fast5 netball pre-season tournament featuring teams from the Netball Superleague. The rules of the tournament are similar, though not identical, to the Fast5 Netball World Series. In 2017 Loughborough Lightning won the inaugural championship.

History
The tournament was established in March 2017 by England Netball in partnership with Barry Hearn's Matchroom Sport. In September 2017 Loughborough Lightning won the inaugural championship.

Format and rules
 The top eight teams from the past season's Netball Superleague are all invited to participate. 
 Each team has a ten player squad which can feature two All-Star or guest players. 
 The tournament features five-a-side teams and 12-minute matches. It also features multiple point shots, unlimited roll on-roll-off substitutions and double point power plays.      
 The tournament uses a double elimination format and is completed in a single day.

Finals

References

External links
 British Fast5 Netball All-Stars Championship on Facebook
  British Fast5 Netball All-Stars Championship on Twitter

Fast5
Netball competitions in the United Kingdom
2017 establishments in England
Recurring sporting events established in 2017
Fast5 netball